Azam Saigol (17 November 1951 – 24 January 2018) was a Pakistani businessperson and politician. He held executive positions at Kohinoor Industries, Saritow Spinning Mills, Pak Elektron, and Azam Textile Mills. He was on the Pakistan International Airlines board from 2013 to 2016, before serving as chairman in 2016.

Early life and education
Saigol was born on 17 November 1951 to Mian Yousuf Saigol, who founded Saigol Group. He was educated at the Aitchison College, Lahore and Government College University, Lahore. For further education, he went to England and studied at the University of Oxford and completed a Bachelor's in economics.

Career
He held executive positions at Kohinoor Industries, Saritow Spinning Mills, Pak Elektron, and Azam Textile Mills. He was on the Pakistan International Airlines board from 2013 to 2016, before serving as chairman in 2016. He resigned in December 2016 citing personal reasons. Press noted that a week prior, a Pakistan International Airlines plane had crashed with 47 fatalities, with The News stating that Saigol had had been pressured to resign afterwards. The airline went without a chairman until December 21, 2016, when Prime Minister Nawaz Sharif announced that the chairmanship had gone to Irfan Elahi, Aviation Secretary.

Personal life
He was married to Amber Haroon Saigol, a scion of Haroon family, who currently heads Dawn. Their daughter, Nazafreen Saigol Lakhani, married into the Lakhani family. Saigol died on 24 January 2018.

References

1951 births
2018 deaths
Pakistan International Airlines people
Aitchison College alumni  
Saigol Group